Canan Tolon (born 1955) is a Turkish-born artist who now lives and works in Emeryville, California. Tolon works in the mediums of printmaking, painting, drawing, sculpture, and installation.

She has exhibited internationally in Ankara, Istanbul, Kiev, London, Los Angeles, New York, Oakland and San Francisco. A Los Angeles Times review in 2014 noted that Tolon's paintings "highlight our tendency to look for recognizable forms" and "also perhaps a comment on the degraded quality of our image landscape."

Early life and education 
Tolon was born in Istanbul in 1955 and spent her childhood in France. after graduating from the Ecole Française d’Istanbul (1975) She studied design and architecture at Napier University in Edinburgh, Scotland (1976), Fachhochschule, Trier, Germany (1979), Middlesex University/Architectural Association, London, England (1980) and University of California, Berkeley, where she earned her master in architecture (1983). Tolon then worked as an architect in France and in San Francisco.

Collections 
Tolon's work is held in the following public collections:
 British Museum, London
 İstanbul Modern, Istanbul IKSV (Istanbul Foundation for Culture and the Arts)

Awards and residencies 
 1989: San Francisco Focus Design Award, San Francisco, California
 1991: Artist in Residence, Bemis Foundation, Omaha, Nebraska
 1992: Artist in Residence, Bemis Foundation, Omaha, Nebraska
 1994: Western States Arts Federation (WESTAF)/NEA; Painting
 1995: Artist in Residence, MacDowell Colony, Peterborough, New Hampshire
 1996: Artist in Residence, The Camargo Foundation, Cassis, France
 1997: Gamblin Fellowship Artist in Residence, Vermont Studio Center
 1998: Berllanderi Sculpture Workshop, Wales
 1998: Arts Council of Wales
 1999: Center for Mediterranean Studies, Georgetown University, Washington, D.C.
 2000: Cité internationale des arts, Paris, France
 2007: Emeryville Public Arts Award, Emeryville, California
 2012: The Kidder Residency in the Arts, Institute for the Humanities, University of Michigan, Ann Arbor

References 

1955 births
Living people
20th-century Turkish women artists
21st-century Turkish women artists
Alumni of Edinburgh Napier University
Alumni of Middlesex University
Artists from Istanbul
University of California alumni